Shira Marili Mirvis (Hebrew: שירה מרילי מירוויס; born 1980), is an Israeli Religious Zionist leader and teacher. In April, 2021 she was chosen as the spiritual leader of the Shirat HaTamar synagogue in Efrat, Israel. She is the first women to hold the position of sole spiritual leader of an Orthodox community in Israel. Marili Mirvis was officially installed by the Chief Rabbi of Efrat Shlomo Riskin. In February 2022 Globes named her one of the 50 most influential women in Israel and in June of that year it was announced that she would be appointed by Religious Affairs Minister Matan Kahana as the interim chair of the Efrat municipality's religious council.   

Marili Mirvis is a graduate of the Women's Institute for Halakhic Leadership at Midreshet Lindenbaum and likewise holds a BA in Psychology and Information Sciences from Bar-Ilan University. The Shirat HaTamar community which she leads consists of around 45 families from various Jewish ethnic traditions: Ashkenazi Jews as well as Jews of Tunisian, Yemenite, and Moroccan origin. One of its aims is “to include women as much as possible within the guidelines of halacha".

Marili Mirvis is married to Shlomo Mirvis, founder and CEO of the tech startup Intelligo and nephew of Rabbi Ephraim Mirvis, Chief Rabbi of United Kingdom and the Commonwealth. They have five children.

See also 
 Dina Brawer
 Lila Kagedan

References

External Links 
 Shirat HaTamar Synagogue
 Susi Bradfield Women’s Institute of Halakhic Leadership
 A Parsha of their Own (פרשה משלהן; Hebrew podcast hosted by Marili Mirvis and Chamutal Shoval)

1980 births
Living people
Orthodox women rabbis
Religious Zionists
Israeli Orthodox rabbis
Israeli settlers
21st-century Israeli women